The Treaty of Xanten was signed in the Lower Rhine town of Xanten on 12 November 1614 between Wolfgang Wilhelm, Count Palatine of Neuburg and John Sigismund, Elector of Brandenburg, with representatives from England and France serving as mediators. The accord officially ended the War of the Jülich Succession and divided the Cleves–Jülich territory between Wilhelm and Sigismund.

Terms
The treaty ended the War of the Jülich Succession and all hostilities between Wolfgang Wilhelm and John Sigismund. Based on the terms of the treaty, the territories of Jülich-Berg and Ravenstein went to Wolfgang Wilhelm and the territories of Cleves-Mark and Ravensberg went to John Sigismund. These last territories were the first provinces at the Rhine and in Westphalia to be governed by the House of Hohenzollern, and were the oldest constituents of the future Prussian Rhineland and the future Province of Westphalia.

See also
List of treaties

References

Sources

External links

1614 in Europe
Xanten
Peace treaties of Prussia
History of the Rhineland
History of North Rhine-Westphalia
1614 treaties
Treaties of the Margraviate of Brandenburg
Treaties of Palatinate-Neuburg
1614 in the Holy Roman Empire
Xanten